Michael Schaeffer House is a historic home located at Evansville, Indiana. It was built in 1894, and is a two-story, Queen Anne style red brick dwelling.  It has a slate roof and limestone detailing.  It features an Eastlake movement style entry porch.

It was added to the National Register of Historic Places in 1982.

References

Evansville
Queen Anne architecture in Indiana
Houses completed in 1894
Houses in Evansville, Indiana
National Register of Historic Places in Evansville, Indiana